Renaissance is the third studio album by American hip hop duo The Underachievers. It was released on May 19, 2017 by RPM MSC. The album features two guest appearance from Mello.  The album artwork was created by Pencil Fingerz.

Singles
The album's lead single, titled "Gotham Nights" was released on Feb 1, 2017. The song was produced by Joshua Heflinger.

The album's second single, titled "Cobra Clutch" was released on February 8, 2017. The song was produced by Tedd Boyd.

The album's third single, titled "Final Destination" was released on March 17, 2017. The song was produced by Powers Pleasant.

The album's fourth single, titled "Head Right" was released on March 28, 2017. The song was produced by Ronny J.

Track listing

Charts

References

2017 albums
Albums produced by Ronny J
The Underachievers albums